Yu Sang (柳瑺, apparently also 柳尙 and 柳相, 유상), alternatively Ryu Sang (류상, 1643–1723), courtesy name Yeojin (汝珍, 여진), was a royal court physician and politician of the Korean Joseon dynasty. He was a smallpox specialist who successfully treated three Joseon kings.

In 1693, due to having cured Sukjong's smallpox, he was granted a political office. Later he became the governor of Seosan, Goyang, Hapcheon and Saknyeong.

His experiences with smallpox are detailed in his book, Gogeum Gyeongheom Hwalyubang. 

Supernatural anecdotes featuring him and a divine being circulated due to his fame.

Family
He was a 23rd-generation descendant of the Munhwa Ryu clan. His father Yu Gyeongjib served as an observation officer (觀察使, gwanchalsa). His son Yu Jungrim was also a medical practitioner who also wrote the agricultural text Jeungbo sallim gyeongje.

References

18th-century Korean physicians
1643 births
1723 deaths
18th-century Korean writers
Joseon writers
Joseon people
17th-century Korean physicians